José Luis Ancalle Gutiérrez is a Peruvian lawyer and politician who was a member of the Congress of the Republic of Peru from 2020 to 2021.

See also
Politics of Peru

References

Living people
Year of birth missing (living people)
Place of birth missing (living people)
21st-century Peruvian lawyers